Kasperi is a district and the oldest suburb (lähiö) of Seinäjoki, Finland. It is located about four kilometers to the southeast from the city center. Kasperi is a part of the Kasperi ward, which also includes the eastern Kivistö and Hallilanvuori districts. The area has multiple services such as a school, a convenience store, a pub and a dentist office.

History 
Kasperi was mostly built during the 1970s and 1980s. The designing of the neighborhood was inspired by the Tapiola district of Espoo. Kasperi was named after Kasperi Kustaa's Kasperi-building which was located in the area.

Gallery

References 

Neighbourhoods in Seinäjoki